Les Cahiers du Sud was a French literary magazine based in Marseilles. It was founded by Jean Ballard in 1925 and published until 1966.

History and profile
Ballard founded Les Cahiers du Sud as a continuation of the Marseilles review Fortunio, founded in 1914 by Marcel Pagnol. Through the poet André Gaillard (1898–1929), the magazine published surrealist writers like René Crevel, Paul Éluard and Benjamin Péret, and ex-surrealists like Antonin Artaud, Robert Desnos. Others published in the magazine included Henri Michaux, Michel Leiris, René Daumal, Pierre Jean Jouve and Pierre Reverdy. Cahiers du Sud also published the poetry of Joë Bousquet. Other contributors included Gabriel Audisio, René Nelli, Simone Weil, Benjamin Fondane, Marguerite Yourcenar, Walter Benjamin and Paul Valéry.

In 1945 Ballard drew up a new editorial board with Jean Tortel and Pierre Guerre.

References

Further reading
 Alain Paire, Chronique des Cahiers du Sud, 1914-1966, 1993

1925 establishments in France
1966 disestablishments in France
Defunct literary magazines published in France
French-language magazines
Magazines established in 1925
Magazines disestablished in 1966
Mass media in Marseille
Surrealist magazines